Victoria blue may refer to:

 Triarylmethane dye#Victoria blue dyes
 Victoria blue BO, a dye
 Victoria blue R, a dye
 Lepidochrysops victoriae, an African butterfly